Rigoberto "Rigo" Guzmán Calderón (11 June 1932 – 22 June 2014) was a Salvadoran football (soccer) player and manager from Atiquizaya.

Club career
Guzmán was a running athlete who competed at the 800 and 3000 metres but later became a football player and captained the Juventud Olimpica Metalio side for eight years.

Managerial career and other professions
Guzmán coached El Salvador at the 1968 Olympic Games. Also, he is a painter and caricaturist and in 2006 he was given the title Maestro Meritísimo de El Salvador after 50 years of educating.

In January 2001, Professor Guzmán fell victim of an earthquake when his house collapsed.

Death
Guzmán died from an undisclosed terminal disease on 22 June 2014.

References

External links
 Tribute - Memorias Guanacas 

1932 births
2014 deaths
People from Ahuachapán Department
Association football midfielders
Salvadoran footballers
Salvadoran football managers
El Salvador national football team managers
Salvadoran artists